Alphaea florescens is a moth of the family Erebidae. It was described by Frederic Moore in 1879. It is found in eastern India (Sikkim, Assam) and Nepal.

References

Moths described in 1879
Spilosomina
Moths of Asia